Nickelodeon is an American basic cable and satellite television network that is part of the Nickelodeon Group, a unit of the Paramount Media Networks division of Paramount Global, which focuses on programs for children and teenagers.

1977–1979: Pre-launch as C-3
Nickelodeon's concept was created by Dr. Vivian Horner, an educator and the director of research on the PBS series The Electric Company. She created the first Nickelodeon series, Pinwheel. The Pinwheel show premiered on December 1, 1977, as part of QUBE, an early local cable television system that was launched in Columbus, Ohio by Warner Cable Corp. One of the ten "community" channels that were offered to QUBE subscribers was C-3, which exclusively broadcast Pinwheel each day from 7:00 a.m. to 9:00 p.m. Eastern Time. Pinwheel became successful enough for Horner to expand her idea into a full channel on national television over a year later.

Nickelodeon was originally seen as a loss leader for then-parent company Warner Cable. As the company saw it, having a commercial-free children's channel would prove useful in franchising its cable systems across the country, with that advantage putting them over rival companies such as HBO.

1979–1984: National launch as Nickelodeon

Initially scheduled for a February 1979 launch, Nickelodeon was officially launched on April 1, 1979 (as the first-ever children's network) on Warner Cable franchises across the country. Initial programming on Nickelodeon included Pinwheel, Video Comic Book, America Goes Bananaz, Nickel Flicks, and By The Way, all of which originated at the QUBE studios in Columbus. For its first few years, Pinwheel was the network's flagship series, and it was played for three to five hours a day in a block format.

Vivian Horner asked her co-workers to help come up with a list of possible names for the network. Sandy Kavanaugh (the producer of Pinwheel) proposed "Nickelodeon," even though she was not fully satisfied with it. In 2013, she recalled, "I wasn't thrilled with 'Nickelodeon.' It was whimsical sounding, though. It had a fun lilt." The channel's first logo and original advertising campaign name were created by New York-based creative director/designer Joseph Iozzi.

The first model ever used in a Nickelodeon advertisement was the designer's son, Joseph Iozzi II, while the logo's font was designed by Lubalin, Smith, Carnase, Inc. The intent of Iozzi was to replace the graphic of the line illustration of the man peering into the Nickelodeon with a period illustration of a boy in nickers, British flat cap, big suspenders, tip toed on a stylish iron train step looking into the Nickelodeon font. Available time and new management never permitted the planned re-design.

Nickelodeon quickly expanded its audience reach, first to other Warner Cable systems across the country, and eventually to other cable providers. It was distributed via satellite on RCA Satcom-1, which went into orbit one week earlier on March 26 – originally transmitted on transponder space purchased from televangelists Jim and Tammy Faye Bakker. The channel was originally uplinked, along with sibling network Star Channel, from a facility located at Buffalo, NY television station WIVB-TV; by December of 1980, it was announced that uplink of both channels would move into a new facility in Hauppauge, NY along with new sibling channel MTV (after a planned expansion to the Buffalo facility was scrapped when Warner-Amex was unable to come to a deal with channel 4's ownership over a long-term lease). Despite its prior history as a part of the QUBE system, Nickelodeon designates 1979 as the year of the channel's official launch.

Nickelodeon's original logo incorporated a man looking into a nickelodeon machine that was placed in the "N" in the wordmark. As Nickelodeon originally operated as a commercial-free service, the network ran interstitials between programs, consisting of a male mime portrayed by character actor/mime Jonathan Schwartz doing tricks in front of a black background. At the time of its launch, Nickelodeon's programming aired for approximately fifteen hours each weekday, from 8:00 a.m. to 11:00 p.m. and for sixteen hours on weekends from 8:00 a.m. to midnight Eastern and Pacific Time. Sibling network Star Channel (later known as The Movie Channel) would take over the channel space after Nickelodeon's broadcast day ended.

On September 14, 1979, American Express reached an agreement with Warner Communications to buy 50% of Warner Cable Corporation for $175 million in cash and short-term notes. Through the formation of the joint venture, which was incorporated in December of that year, both Star Channel and Nickelodeon were folded into Warner-Amex Satellite Entertainment (later Warner-Amex Cable Communications), a company which handled the operations of the group's cable channels (Warner Cable was folded into a separate jointly owned unit, the Warner Cable Corporation).

New shows were added to the Nickelodeon lineup in 1980, including Dusty's Treehouse, First Row Features, Special Delivery, What Will They Think Of Next? and Livewire. 1980 was also the start of the Cy Schneider era of Nickelodeon, which would become known years later as the "green vegetable era" as it focused mainly on programs that parents thought were good and appropriate for children, but not necessarily what the children themselves wanted to see. In 1981, Nickelodeon introduced a new logo, consisting of a silver ball overlaid by multicolored "Nickelodeon" text. Later that year, the Canadian sketch comedy series You Can't Do That on Television made its American debut on Nickelodeon, becoming the channel's first hit series. The green slime originally featured on that program was later adopted by Nickelodeon as a primary feature of many of its shows, including the game show Double Dare, as well as becoming a signature of the network in general. Other shows that were part of Nickelodeon's regular schedule during its early years included The Third Eye, Standby...Lights! Camera! Action! and Mr. Wizard's World.

On April 12, 1981, Nickelodeon shifted its daily programming to thirteen hours every day, now airing from 8:00 a.m. to 9:00 p.m. Eastern and Pacific Time, seven days a week. By this time, The Movie Channel had become a separate 24-hour channel, and Nickelodeon had begun turning over its channel space during its off-hours to the Alpha Repertory Television Service (ARTS) – a fine arts-focused network owned by the Hearst Corporation and ABC joint venture Hearst/ABC Video Services; ARTS became the Arts & Entertainment Network (A&E) in 1984, after ARTS merged with NBC's struggling cable service The Entertainment Channel. Around this time, Warner-Amex Satellite Entertainment began divesting its assets and spun off Nickelodeon and music network MTV into the newly formed subsidiary MTV Networks; in order to increase revenue, Nickelodeon began to accept corporate underwriting (a method common in public television) for its programming.

1984–1991: Building the network empire

Nickelodeon struggled at first, operating at a loss of $10 million by 1984. The network had lacked successful programs (shows on the network that failed to gain traction during its first few years included Against the Odds and Going Great), which stagnated viewership, at one point finishing dead last among all U.S. cable channels.

After firing its management staff, MTV Networks president Bob Pittman turned to Fred Seibert and Alan Goodman, who had created MTV's iconic channel IDs a few years earlier, to reinvigorate Nickelodeon, leading to what many believe to be the start of the channel's "golden age". Seibert and Goodman's company, Fred/Alan Inc., teamed up with Tom Corey and Scott Nash of the advertising firm Corey McPherson Nash to rebrand the network. The "pinball" logo was replaced with a new one featuring varied orange backgrounds (a "splat" design) with the "Nickelodeon" name overlaid in the Balloon typeface, which would be used in hundreds of different variations over the next 24 years. Fred/Alan also enlisted the help of animators, writers, producers and doo-wop group The Jive Five (best known for their 1961 hit "My True Story") to create new channel IDs. The rebranding went into use on October 1, 1984, and within six months, Nickelodeon would become the dominant channel in children's programming and remained so for 26 years, even in the midst of increasing competition in more recent years from other kids-oriented cable channels such as Disney Channel and Cartoon Network. Nickelodeon also began promoting itself as "The First Kids' Network", due to its status as the first American television network aimed at children. Along with the rebrand, Nickelodeon also began accepting traditional advertising.

In the summer of 1984, A&E announced that it would become a separate 24-hour channel as of January 1985. After A&E stopped sharing its channel space, Nickelodeon ran text promos for their daytime shows during the night, before officially becoming a 24-hour channel in June, although some cable systems provided programming from a niche cable television service that had no room on system airing on the channel space, with BET being among the most popular choices. Pittman tasked general manager Geraldine Laybourne to develop programming for the late evening and overnight timeslot; to help with ideas, Laybourne enlisted Seibert and Goodman, who conceived the idea of a classic television block modeled after the "Greatest Hits of All Time" oldies radio format after being presented with over 200 episodes of The Donna Reed Show (a series that Laybourne personally hated). On July 1, 1985, Nickelodeon launched their new nighttime block, Nick at Nite, in the 8 p.m. to 6 a.m. Eastern and Pacific time period.

That same year, American Express sold its stake in Warner-Amex to Warner Communications, who in 1986 turned MTV Networks into a private company, and subsequently sold Nickelodeon, MTV, and the newly launched music video network VH1 to Viacom for $685 million, ending Warner's venture into children's television until they launched the Kids' WB block in 1995. In 1988, the network aired the inaugural Nickelodeon Kids' Choice Awards (previously known as The Big Ballot), a telecast in the vein of the People's Choice Awards in which viewers select their favorites in television, movies and sports. It also introduced an educational program block called Nick Jr., which started off by airing reruns of Pinwheel and other preschool-targeted shows.

On June 7, 1990, Nickelodeon opened Nickelodeon Studios, a hybrid television production facility/attraction at Universal Studios Florida in Orlando, Florida, where many of its sitcoms and game shows were filmed. It also entered into a multimillion-dollar joint marketing agreement with Pizza Hut, which provided a new kid-targeted publication Nickelodeon Magazine for free at the chain's participating restaurants.

1991–1998: Golden Age, establishing original animation, and expansion into scripted programming

Although Nickelodeon had aired externally-produced animation series since the channel's launch in 1977, the network did not air original animated series of its own until the early 1990s. On August 11, 1991, Nickelodeon debuted their "Nicktoons" brand with three original animated series: Doug, Rugrats, and The Ren & Stimpy Show. The development of these programs was a direct reversal of the network's prior concerns, as Nickelodeon had previously refused to produce weekly animated series due to the high production costs. The three series found success by 1992, with Ren & Stimpy at one point being the most popular show on cable television. This resulted in the creation of the network's fourth Nicktoon, Rocko's Modern Life, which also became a success. In the meantime, Nickelodeon partnered with Sony Wonder to release episode compilations of the network's programs on VHS, which became top sellers. Following Viacom's purchase of Paramount Pictures in 1994, Nickelodeon would switch its home video distribution to Paramount Home Entertainment, subsequently re-releasing episode compilations of the network's Nicktoons. Doug would end its production in 1994, with Ren & Stimpy following suit in 1996; however, Doug would be revived in 1996 as part of ABC's "One Saturday Morning" lineup, following the show's acquisition by Disney. Rugrats, on the other hand, returned from its productIon hiatus on May 9, 1997 (reruns had continued to air on the channel up until that point), and became the anchor for the network as its top-rated program.

On August 15, 1992, the network extended its Saturday schedule by two hours, anchored by the launch of a new primetime block called SNICK from 8:00 to 10:00 p.m. Eastern and Pacific Time; over the years, SNICK became home to shows such as Are You Afraid of the Dark?, Clarissa Explains It All, All That, The Amanda Show, and Kenan & Kel. In 2004, the block was reformatted as the Saturday edition of TEENick, which had originally debuted on Sunday evenings in 2001. The Saturday night block still continues today and was not officially branded from 2009 to 2012, when the "Gotta See Saturdays" brand was adopted for the Saturday morning and primetime blocks; the TEENick branding, with its spelling altered to TeenNick, has been used as the name for a Nickelodeon sister channel since late 2009. After a three-year absence following suspension of the publication in 1990, Nickelodeon resumed Nickelodeon Magazine under a pay/subscription format in June 1993. In March 1993, the channel enlisted the help of viewers to come up with new shapes in which to display its iconic orange logo in the network's promotions. The designs chosen – a cap, a balloon, a gear, a rocket and a top, among other shapes – were mainly 3D renderings, and debuted alongside a new promotional graphics package in June of that year. By the end of 1995, the success of the SNICK block led Nickelodeon to expand its programming into primetime on other nights starting in 1996, with the extension of its broadcast day to 8:30 p.m. Eastern and Pacific Time (and later extended to 9:00 p.m. from 1998 to 2009) on Sunday through Friday nights.

In 1994, Nickelodeon launched The Big Help, which spawned the spin-off program The Big Green Help in 2007; the program is intended to encourage activity and environmental preservation by children. That same year, Nickelodeon removed You Can't Do That on Television from its schedule after a 13-year run and subsequently debuted a new original sketch comedy show, All That. For many years, until its cancellation in 2005, All That would launch the careers of several actors and actresses including Kenan Thompson, Kel Mitchell, Amanda Bynes, Nick Cannon and Jamie Lynn Spears. Dan Schneider, one of the show's executive producers, would go on to create and produce numerous hit series for Nickelodeon including Kenan & Kel, The Amanda Show, Drake & Josh, Zoey 101, iCarly, Victorious, Sam & Cat (a spin-off of the former two series), Henry Danger, and Game Shakers. Also in 1994, Nickelodeon debuted their fifth Nicktoon Aaahh!!! Real Monsters, which would also become a hit series. In October and December 1994, Nickelodeon sold a syndication package of Halloween and Christmas-themed episodes of its Nicktoons to television stations across the United States, in conjunction with then-new corporate relative, Paramount Domestic Television.

On February 13, 1996, Herb Scannell was named president of Nickelodeon, succeeding Geraldine Laybourne, and would hold the position for ten years. Around that time, the sister channel TV Land was launched; with the channel being a pseudo-spinoff of Nickelodeon's Nick at Nite program block. In 1997, Albie Hecht became president of film and television entertainment for Nickelodeon before leaving to be president of the Viacom network TNN (now called Paramount Network) in 2003.

Up until the 1990s, Saturday morning cartoons had been the most popular children's programs on television. Because of the imposition of educational television mandates on all broadcast stations in 1996, Nickelodeon and other children's-oriented cable networks (never subject to those mandates as they did not broadcast over the air) now had an advantage in that they were not obligated to have its programs comply with the mandate. By 1997, Nickelodeon's Saturday morning lineup had shot ahead of all its broadcast competition, where it would remain for the next several years. Nickelodeon released its first feature-length film in theaters in 1996, an adaptation of the Louise Fitzhugh novel Harriet the Spy starring Michelle Trachtenberg and Rosie O'Donnell. The film went on to earn twice its $13 million budget.

1998–2005: Silver Age and further exploring and marketing programs
Two years after Harriet'''s success, Nickelodeon developed its popular Rugrats Nicktoon onto the big screen with The Rugrats Movie, which grossed more than $100 million in the United States and became the first non-Disney animated movie to surpass that amount. In 1998, Nickelodeon inked a deal with Broderbund Software to produce CD-ROM games starting in 1999. Broderbund's successor Mattel Interactive would eventually produce games based on The Wild Thornberrys in 2000 for the Game Boy Color and PlayStation.

On April 28, 1998, Nickelodeon and Sesame Workshop partnered to put together an initial investment of $100 million to start an educational television brand for children and pre-teens aged 6–12. The "kids' thinking channel" was named Noggin (derived from a slang term for "head") to reflect its purpose as an educational medium. Sesame Workshop initially planned for it to be an advertiser-supported service, but later decided that it should debut as a commercial-free network. Noggin officially launched on February 2, 1999, and aired programming from both Sesame Workshop and Nickelodeon's archive libraries.

On May 1, 1999, the channel previewed the animated series SpongeBob SquarePants directly after the 1999 Kids' Choice Awards. The show would go on to become the most popular Nicktoon in the channel's history, and has remained very popular to this day, consistently ranking as the channel's highest-rated series since 2000. By 2001, a third of the series' audience was made up of adults, and the show was run in evening slots. A film adaptation of SpongeBob SquarePants was announced in 2002. The ensuing SpongeBob media franchise went on to generate over $13 billion in merchandising revenue for Nickelodeon.

In 2001, Nickelodeon obtained an extended agreement with THQ to produce video games based on their franchises, such as computer game rights to Rugrats, SpongeBob SquarePants and Rocket Power and console and computer rights to other Nickelodeon shows like Jimmy Neutron: Boy Genius and The Wild Thornberrys. The agreement also covered games based on original intellectual properties, such as Tak and the Power of Juju, with the potential that THQ would release a game first, followed by an animated cartoon on Nickelodeon.

In March 2004, Nickelodeon and Nick at Nite were separated in the Nielsen primetime and total day ratings, due to the different programming, advertisers and target audiences between the two services. This caused controversy by cable executives believing this tactic manipulated the ratings, given that Nick at Nite's broadcast day takes up only a fraction of Nickelodeon's programming schedule. Nickelodeon and Nick at Nite's respective ratings periods encompass only the hours they each operate under the total day rankings, though Nickelodeon only is rated for the daytime ratings; this is due to a ruling by Nielsen in July 2004 that networks must program for 51% or more of a daypart to qualify for ratings for a particular daypart.

In February 2005, Nickelodeon premiered the animated series Avatar: The Last Airbender, which quickly became a hit series for the network. Nickelodeon Studios closed on April 30, 2005 and was converted into the Blue Man Group Sharp Aquos Theatre in 2007. Prior to the studio's official closure, Nickelodeon had moved production for most, if not all, of its live-action series to the Nickelodeon on Sunset studios (formerly the Earl Carroll Theatre) in Hollywood, California. Nickelodeon began filming at the studio in 1997, and the company continued to film at the Sunset location until 2017.

2005–2009: Bronze Age, company changes, and music cross-promotions
On June 14, 2005, Viacom decided to split itself into two companies as a result of the declining performance of its stock, which Sumner Redstone stated "was necessary to respond to a changing industry landscape." Both resulting companies would be controlled by Viacom's parent National Amusements. In December 2005, Nickelodeon and the remainder of the MTV Networks division, as well as Paramount Pictures, BET Networks, and Famous Music (a record label that the company sold off in 2007), were spun off to the new Viacom. The original Viacom was renamed CBS Corporation and retained CBS and its other broadcasting assets, Showtime Networks, Paramount Television (now the separate arms CBS Studios for network and cable production, and CBS Media Ventures for production of first-run syndicated programs and off-network series distribution), advertising firm Viacom Outdoor (which was renamed CBS Outdoor), Simon & Schuster, and Paramount Parks (which was later sold).

On January 4, 2006, Herb Scannell resigned from Nickelodeon, and Cyma Zarghami was appointed in his place as president of the newly formed Kids & Family Group, which included Nickelodeon, Nick at Nite, Nick Jr., TeenNick, Nicktoons, TV Land, CMT, and CMT Pure Country. In October 2006, the channel struck a deal with DreamWorks Animation to develop the studio's animated films into television series, starting in with 2008's The Penguins of Madagascar.

In 2007, Nickelodeon entered into a four-year development deal with Sony Music to produce music-themed TV shows for the network, to help fund and launch tie-in albums, and to produce original soundtrack songs that could be released as singles. The Naked Brothers Band, a rock-mockumentary series that tells of a pre-teenage rock band led by two real-life brothers who write and perform the songs, aired on the channel from 2007 to 2009; it was successful for children in the 6-11 age group. By February 2007, the band's song "Crazy Car" was on the Billboard Hot 100, and the soundtrack albums from the first two seasons, each of which signed to Columbia Records, were on Billboard 200.

2009–2016: Rebranding and ratings competition

In early 2009, Nickelodeon unveiled a new logo that would be implemented toward the end of the year, designed by New York City–based creative director/designer Eric Zim. It was part of a year dedicated to strengthening the brand's identity. The logo was intended to create a unified look that can better be conveyed across all of MTV Networks' children's channels. On February 2, Nickelodeon discontinued the TEENick block, as the name would soon be used for its own channel. The new logo debuted on September 28, 2009, across Nickelodeon, Nick at Nite, and Nicktoons, along with the newly launched TeenNick (named after the TEENick block) and Nick Jr. (named after the concurrently-running Nick Jr. block).

The wordmark logo bug was given a blimp background in the days prior to the 2010 and 2011 Kids' Choice Awards to match the award given out at the ceremony; beginning the week of September 7, 2010, the logo bug was surrounded by a splat design (in the manner of the logo used from 2005 to 2009) during new episodes of Nickelodeon original series. The new logo was adopted in the United Kingdom on February 15, 2010, in Spain on February 19, 2010, in Southeast Asia on March 15, 2010, in Latin America on April 5, 2010, in India on June 25, 2010 and on the ABS-CBN block "Nickelodeon on ABS-CBN" in the Philippines on July 26, 2010. On November 2, 2009, a Canadian version of Nickelodeon was launched, in partnership between Viacom and Corus Entertainment (owners of YTV, which had aired and continued to air Nickelodeon's series); as a result, versions of Nickelodeon now exist in most of North America.

In October 2009 and September 2010, respectively, Viacom brought Teenage Mutant Ninja Turtles and Winx Club into the Nickelodeon family by purchasing both franchises. Nickelodeon Animation Studio produced a new CGI-animated Turtles series and new seasons of Winx Club with CGI sequences. Both productions comprised Nickelodeon's strategy to reboot two established brands for new viewers: TMNT was intended to reach an audience of boys aged 6 to 11, and Winx was aimed at the same age group of girls. In February 2011, Viacom bought out a third of Rainbow SpA, the Italian studio that introduced Winx Club. The purchase was valued at 62 million euros (US$83 million) and led to new shows being co-developed by Rainbow and Nickelodeon, including My American Friend and Club 57. Also in 2011, Nickelodeon debuted House of Anubis, a series based on the Nickelodeon Netherlands series Het Huis Anubis, which became the first original scripted series to be broadcast in a weekdaily strip (similar to the soap opera format). Produced in the United Kingdom, it was also the first original series by the flagship U.S. channel to be produced entirely outside of North America.

Nick's only greenlit series produced under the Sony Music partnership, Victorious, ran from 2010 to 2013. A similar hit music-themed sitcom Big Time Rush ran from 2009 to 2013, and featured a similar partnership with Columbia Records; however, Columbia was only involved with the show's music, and Sony Music became involved with the series' production midway through its first season. It became Nickelodeon's second-most successful live-action show of all time after iCarly; Big Time Rush garnered 6.8 million viewers for its official debut on January 18, 2010, setting a new record as the highest-rated live action series premiere in the channel's history.

2011 saw Nickelodeon's longtime ratings dominance among all children's cable channels begin to topple: it was the highest-rated cable channel during the first half of that year, only for its viewership to experience a sharp double-digit decline by the end of 2011, described as "inexplicable" by Viacom management. The channel would not experience a calendar week ratings increase until November 2012 (with viewership slowly rebounding after that point); however its 17-year streak as the highest-rated cable network in total day viewership was broken by Disney Channel during that year. Around late 2012, Nickelodeon made a sweeping change to their network by cancelling and/or ending their tween & teen shows (How to Rock, iCarly, Victorious, Bucket & Skinner's Epic Adventures, House of Anubis, Supah Ninjas, Hollywood Heights and Big Time Rush) in favor of newer shows targeted to a younger block. On July 17, 2014, the network televised the inaugural Kids' Choice Sports, a spin-off of the Kids' Choice Awards that honors athletes and teams from the previous year in sports.

2016–present: Reviving older properties and expanding across platforms

Since 2016, the network has begun to produce TV movies based on its older properties, including those of Legends of the Hidden Temple, Hey Arnold!, Rocko's Modern Life, and Invader Zim. The former two aired on the Nickelodeon channel, while the latter two premiered in August 2019 on Netflix. Also in 2016, the network premiered The Loud House, which became one of their most successful series. 

In June 2018, Cyma Zarghami stepped down as president of Nickelodeon, after 33 years of working at the network. In October 2018, All That co-creator Brian Robbins succeeded her as president of Nickelodeon.

In January 2019, Viacom acquired the streaming service Pluto TV, which has since launched various Nickelodeon-branded channels. In August, Viacom acquired the rights to the Garfield franchise, with plans for a new animated TV series. Later that year, Viacom signed a multiyear content production agreement with Netflix to produce several original films and series based on Nickelodeon properties. 

After Viacom re-merged with CBS Corporation to form ViacomCBS at the end of 2019, it was announced that Nickelodeon content would be available for streaming on CBS All Access. The streaming service would relaunch as Paramount+ on March 4, 2021, with the SpongeBob SquarePants spinoff Kamp Koral and The SpongeBob Movie: Sponge on the Run debuting on the service that same day. Throughout 2021, Paramount+ would announce and debut new programming based on Nickelodeon IP, including a live-action sequel series to The Fairly OddParents that premiered in March 2022, a CGI-animated reboot of Rugrats, and an iCarly sequel series.

CBS Sports began partnering with Nickelodeon on its coverage of the National Football League, with Nickelodeon simulcasting a special version of an early 2021 Wild Card playoff game under the NFL on Nickelodeon banner. Nickelodeon would also figure prominently in CBS' own coverage of Super Bowl LV later that year, with special programming and content pertaining to the game itself. The NFL would extend its partnership with Nickelodeon by allowing them to air another Wild Card game in January 2022, and a weekly highlights show hosted by CBS' Nate Burleson with Tyler Perry's Young Dylan'' star Dylan Gilmer. Nickelodeon aired its first regular-season game in 2022, with the Denver Broncos taking on the defending Super Bowl champion Los Angeles Rams as part of the NFL's Christmas Day slate.

On March 4, 2023, coinciding with their broadcast of the 2023 Kids' Choice Awards, the network unveiled an updated branding campaign and on-screen logo, retaining the 2009-era typeface logo but adding a paint-like "splat" effect behind it, similar to the pre-2009 logo.

Notes

References

Bibliography

 
 
 

Nickelodeon
History of television in the United States
History of television channels
Nickelodeon
Nickelodeon
Nickelodeon
Nickelodeon
Nickelodeon
Nickelodeon
Children's television in the United States